Cryptocentrus also known as Watchman gobies, and one of the genera known as shrimp gobies or prawn gobies, is a genus of gobies native to tropical marine waters of the Indian and Pacific oceans.

Species
There are currently 35 recognized species in this genus:
 Cryptocentrus albidorsus (Yanagisawa, 1978) (White-backed shrimpgoby)
 Cryptocentrus bulbiceps (Whitley, 1953) (Bluelined shrimpgoby)
 Cryptocentrus caeruleomaculatus (Herre, 1933) (Blue-speckled prawn-goby)
 Cryptocentrus caeruleopunctatus (Rüppell, 1830) (Harlequin prawn-goby)
 Cryptocentrus callopterus H. M. Smith, 1945
 Cryptocentrus cebuanus Herre, 1927 (Cebu shrimpgoby)
 Cryptocentrus cinctus (Herre, 1936) (Yellow prawn-goby)
 Cryptocentrus cryptocentrus (Valenciennes, 1837) (Ninebar prawn-goby)
 Cryptocentrus cyanospilotus G. R. Allen & J. E. Randall, 2011 (Bluespot shrimpgoby)
 Cryptocentrus cyanotaenia (Bleeker, 1853) (Lagoon shrimpgoby)
 Cryptocentrus diproctotaenia Bleeker, 1876
 Cryptocentrus epakros G. R. Allen, 2015 (Pointedfin shrimpgoby) 
 Cryptocentrus fasciatus (Playfair (fr), 1867) (Y-bar shrimpgoby)
 Cryptocentrus flavus Yanagisawa, 1978
 Cryptocentrus inexplicatus (Herre, 1934) (Inexplicable shrimpgoby)
 Cryptocentrus insignitus (Whitley, 1956) (Signal goby)
 Cryptocentrus leonis H. M. Smith, 1931
 Cryptocentrus leptocephalus Bleeker, 1876 (Pink-speckled shrimpgoby)
 Cryptocentrus leucostictus (Günther, 1872) (Saddled prawn-goby)
 Cryptocentrus lutheri Klausewitz, 1960 (Luther's prawn-goby)
 Cryptocentrus malindiensis (J. L. B. Smith, 1959)
 Cryptocentrus maudae Fowler, 1937 (Maude's shrimpgoby)
 Cryptocentrus melanopus (Bleeker, 1860)
 Cryptocentrus multicinctus G. R. Allen & J. E. Randall, 2011 (Multibarred shrimpgoby)
 Cryptocentrus nigrocellatus (Yanagisawa, 1978)
 Cryptocentrus niveatus (Valenciennes, 1837)
 Cryptocentrus octofasciatus Regan, 1908 (Blue-speckled prawn-goby)
 Cryptocentrus pavoninoides (Bleeker, 1849)
 Cryptocentrus polyophthalmus (Bleeker, 1853)
 Cryptocentrus pretiosus (Rendahl (de), 1924)
 Cryptocentrus shigensis N. Kuroda, 1956 (Shige shrimpgoby)
 Cryptocentrus strigilliceps (D. S. Jordan & Seale, 1906) (Target shrimpgoby)
 Cryptocentrus tentaculatus Hoese & Larson, 2004 (Tentacle shrimpgoby)
 Cryptocentrus wehrlei Fowler, 1937
 Cryptocentrus yatsui Tomiyama, 1936

References

 
Gobiinae
Marine fish genera
Taxa named by Achille Valenciennes